Wilbert William Hubbell (born June 17, 1897 – August 3, 1980) was an American professional baseball pitcher. He played in Major League Baseball from 1919 to 1925. He attended college at the University of Idaho. He was born in San Francisco, California, and died in Lakewood, Colorado.

Hubbell was hit in the head by a line drive on May 27, 1922, which fractured his skull. "In the Brooklyn half of the first inning in the first game of a double header at the Philadelphia National League Park a line drive from Tom Griffith's bat struck pitcher Wilbur Hubbell the Philadelphia pitcher, who did not have time to get out of the ball's way. The sphere hit him on the left side of the head and he dropped to the ground..." He was out of the hospital on June 3, 1922, almost completely recovered from the injury. Newspaper reports at the time said he would wear "a specially constructed steel plate to guard the area over his right ear" against further  injuries.

References

External links

1897 births
1980 deaths
Baseball players from California
Major League Baseball pitchers
Brooklyn Robins players
Philadelphia Phillies players
New York Giants (NL) players
Idaho Vandals baseball players
Toronto Maple Leafs (International League) players
Minneapolis Millers (baseball) players
Reading Keystones players
Baltimore Orioles (IL) players
Mission Reds players
Seattle Indians players
Oakland Oaks (baseball) players
Sacramento Senators players
Shreveport Sports players
Tyler Sports players
Portland Beavers players